Stefan Jackiw (born 1985) is an American classical violinist.

Biography
Stefan Jackiw was born in Boston, Massachusetts. His parents are both prominent physics professors, now retired with emeritus status. His mother, So-Young Pi, was the daughter of Korean poet and essayist Pi Chun-deuk. She was on the faculty at Boston University.
His father, Roman Jackiw, was born in Poland to a Ukrainian family. He was on the faculty at MIT.

Jackiw started playing the violin at the age of four when he was given a small instrument that a child of family friends had outgrown.  As a young child, he took Suzuki method lessons at the Longy School of Music.  Subsequently, his teachers have included Zinaida Gilels, whom he credits with providing a secure technical foundation, the French violinist Michèle Auclair, with whom he began studying at age 12, and former Cleveland Quartet first violinist Donald Weilerstein.

Unlike many young musicians, who attend schools for the arts or are home-schooled, Jackiw went through the academic school system, attending The Roxbury Latin School in West Roxbury.  After high school he attended Harvard University, starting as a psychology major, then switching to a concentration in music.  He graduated with a Bachelor of Arts degree in 2007.  The same year, he received an Artist Diploma at the New England Conservatory (NEC), which he had been attending concurrently.

Some of the great violinists who have especially influenced him are Jascha Heifetz, Fritz Kreisler, Arthur Grumiaux, and Nathan Milstein.  But his musical role model is cellist Yo-Yo Ma. In a 2007 interview with The Harvard Crimson, Jackiw said of Ma, "He throws himself into every activity that he’s involved in.  I’ve seen him perform countless times and he is always so involved, and gets the audience involved."

After graduation, Jackiw moved to New York City, where he currently makes his home.

Career
Jackiw made his professional debut at the age of 12, when Boston Pops director Keith Lockhart invited him to perform on Opening Night in 1997, playing the Wieniawski Violin Concerto No. 2.  Within a year came appearances with the Minnesota Orchestra.  In 2000 he made his European debut with the Philharmonia Orchestra in London, with Zander conducting.  The critically acclaimed performance landed Jackiw's picture on the front page of The Times, while The Strad reported that "a fourteen-year-old violinist took the London music world by storm."  The following year he performed with the Orchestre Philharmonique de Strasbourg and in recital at the Schleswig-Holstein Music Festival.

More than once during his young career he has been called upon on short notice to fill in for other noted violinists: in 2002 for Pamela Frank with the Baltimore Symphony, and again in 2007 for Janine Jansen in a Boston Symphony Orchestra performance at Tanglewood. The 2002 substitution with the Baltimore Symphony, under Yuri Temirkanov, led to a continuing relationship with that orchestra, which included a tour of Japan in 2002 and a performance at the Winter Arts Festival in St. Petersburg, Russia, a year later.

Among other American orchestras with which he has collaborated are the Chicago Symphony Orchestra (with which he debuted in the 2002 season under Roberto Abbado), the New York Philharmonic, the Cleveland Orchestra, the San Francisco Symphony, the Pittsburgh Symphony Orchestra, the Minnesota Orchestra, the Indianapolis, Nashville, Milwaukee, Seattle, and Utah Symphonies, and the Boston Philharmonic Orchestra.  Abroad, he has performed with the Seoul Philharmonic, the Tokyo Symphony Orchestra, the Bournemouth Symphony Orchestra, l'Orchestra del Maggio Musicale Fiorentino, the Royal Liverpool Philharmonic, the Ulster Orchestra, the National Symphony Orchestra of Ireland, the Naples Philharmonic Orchestra and the Asian Youth Orchestra.

Among Jackiw's chamber music and recital activities have been appearances in the Rising Stars Series at the Ravinia and Caramoor Festivals, the Boston Celebrity Series, Rockport Chamber Festival, Metropolitan Museum of Art's Accolades series, Louvre Recital Series in Paris, and Mostly Mozart Festival.
He is a regular performer at the summer and winter festival concerts of the Seattle Chamber Music Society.  He has been a member of the Korean chamber ensemble Ditto, and is a former member of the Tessara Quartet, founded in New York in 2007.

In 2011, Jackiw performed the finale of Mendelssohn's violin concerto for the 2011 YouTube Symphony Orchestra "Grande Finale" concert. Since July 2020, Jackiw started his own masterclass called "Stefan's Sessions". Jackiw premiered David Fulmer's 2nd violin concerto, and Conrad Tao's violin concerto in 2022.

Violin and bow
Jackiw's violin was made by Vincenzo Rugeri of Cremona, Italy, in 1704 and his bow by François Nicolas Voirin of Paris, France in the mid-nineteenth century.

As of 2022, Jackiw has a 1750 violin by Giovanni Battista Guadagnini loaned by the Avery Fisher Career Grant.

Honors
Stefan Jackiw has received a number of honors, including:
Avery Fisher Career Grant (2002)
Louis Sudler Prize in the Arts
Best debut of the year, 2004–2005 season, Seattle Times and Seattle Post-Intelligencer
One of the top two solo appearances of the year, Boston Globe (2002)

Discography

Brahms Complete Sonatas for Violin and Piano with Max Levinson (Sony Classical, 2009)
Prodigies: Violin Masterpieces from the Greatest Talents (Classic FM, ASIN: B0015CXXD8)
Richard Strauss - Ein Heldenleben, et al. Benjamin Zander, New England Conservatory (CPI Records, ASIN: B001LGIQKS)

References

External links
 Stefan Jackiw Official Site.
Website at Opus 3 Artists.
"SPOTLIGHT: Stefan P. Jackiw '07," – article in The Harvard Crimson, Feb. 22, 2007.

American classical violinists
Male classical violinists
American male violinists
Musicians from Boston
1985 births
Living people
American people of Ukrainian descent
American classical musicians of Korean descent
Harvard University alumni
Roxbury Latin School alumni
New England Conservatory alumni
Classical musicians from Massachusetts
21st-century classical violinists
21st-century American male musicians
21st-century American violinists